Pavel Hristov Ivanov (born 3 February 1951) is a retired light-flyweight Greco-Roman wrestler from Bulgaria who won two silver and one bronze medals at the European and world championships in 1973–1979. He competed at the 1980 Summer Olympics and placed fourth.

References

External links
 

1951 births
Living people
Olympic wrestlers of Bulgaria
Wrestlers at the 1980 Summer Olympics
Bulgarian male sport wrestlers
World Wrestling Championships medalists
Sportspeople from Haskovo Province
20th-century Bulgarian people
21st-century Bulgarian people